Kolyvansky District is an administrative and municipal district (raion), one of the thirty in Novosibirsk Oblast, Russia. It is located in the northeast of the oblast. Its administrative center is the urban locality (a work settlement) of Kolyvan. Population: 24,049 (2010 Census);  The population of Kolyvan accounts for 49.2% of the district's total population.

References

Notes

Sources

Districts of Novosibirsk Oblast